David Owino Odhiambo (born 5 April 1988), nicknamed "Calabar", is a Kenyan footballer who plays for ZESCO United in the Zambian Premier League and the Kenya national team as a defender. He previously played for Gor Mahia in the Kenyan Premier League.

International career

International goals
Scores and results list Kenya's goal tally first.

References

External links
 
 

1988 births
Living people
People from Nakuru
Kenyan footballers
Kenya international footballers
Association football defenders
Gor Mahia F.C. players
Kenyan Premier League players
ZESCO United F.C. players
Kenyan expatriate footballers
Expatriate footballers in Zambia
Kenyan expatriate sportspeople in Zambia
2019 Africa Cup of Nations players